Bromwich may refer to:

Places
West Bromwich,  Metropolitan Borough of Sandwell, West Midlands, England
Castle Bromwich, Metropolitan Borough of Solihull, West Midlands, England
East Bromwich, a fictional place
People
Andrew Bromwich (c.1640–1702), English Roman Catholic priest
David Bromwich, American academic
David H. Bromwich, American meteorologist
Jesse Bromwich (born 1989), New Zealand rugby league player
John Bromwich (1918–1999), Australian tennis player
Kenny Bromwich (born 1991), New Zealand rugby league player
Michael R. Bromwich (born 1953), United States Department of the Interior official
Rachel Bromwich (1915–2010), British linguist
Thomas John I'Anson Bromwich (1875–1929), English mathematician

Sports
West Bromwich Albion F.C., English Football Club